Winslow Congregational Church was a historic church building located at 61 Winthrop Street in Taunton, Massachusetts. The church was built in 1897 and added to the National Historic Register in 1984. At that time, it was considered one of the city's "most impressive" 19th century churches, with its sandstone construction and Gothic detailing.

In 1969, the historic church building was sold to the First Portuguese Baptist Church, founded in 1932 for bi-lingual worship services in English and Portuguese. The congregation was renamed the Baptist Church of All Nations in 1977. The historic 1897 church was later demolished and replaced with a new building.

See also
National Register of Historic Places listings in Taunton, Massachusetts

References

National Register of Historic Places in Taunton, Massachusetts
United Church of Christ churches in Massachusetts
Churches on the National Register of Historic Places in Massachusetts
Churches in Bristol County, Massachusetts
Demolished buildings and structures in Massachusetts
Buildings and structures in Taunton, Massachusetts
Congregational churches in Massachusetts